The Taipei Expo Park is a multifunctional park in Zhongshan District, Taipei, Taiwan.

Park facilities
The Taipei Expo Park consists of:
 Taipei Children's Recreation Center
 Yuanshan Marketplace
 Yuanshan Plaza
 Expo Dome
 Taipei Story House
 Taipei Fine Arts Museum
 Taiwan Excellence Pavilion
 Pavilion of Aroma of Flowers
 Expo Hall
 Rose Garden
 Lin Ai-tai Historic House
 Pavilion of Future
 Pavilion of Taipei Robot
 Pavilion of Angel Life

Notable events
 Taipei International Flora Exposition (2010-2011)
 Taipei Rose Garden (2017)

Transportation
The park is accessible within walking distance east from Yuanshan Station of the Taipei Metro.

See also
 List of parks in Taiwan
 Taipei International Flora Exposition

References

External links

 

2010 establishments in Taiwan
Parks in Taipei
Museum districts
Art gallery districts
Culture in Taipei
World's fair sites in Taiwan